Li Ziliu (4 January 1932 – 25 December 2022) was a Chinese politician who served as Mayor of Guangzhou from 1990 to 1996.

Biography
Li was born in Shunde, Guangdong, Republic of China on 4 January 1932, into a peasant family and he studied for only two years in a primary school. He joined the Chinese Communist Party in 1953. During the Cultural Revolution between 1966 and 1969, he was listed as "rightist", tortured by the Red Guards and sent to prison for two years. In 1974, Li was appointed the Communist Party Secretary of Shunde County. In 1983, he was appointed to be the party secretary of Jiangmen City. During his term of service, he drove the construction of the bridge linking Jiangmen and Zhongshan to improve the city's transportation network. In 1990, he was appointed Mayor of Guangzhou. He facilitated the construction of highways to Baiyun Airport and the Guangzhou Metro during his term of service.

After his retirement in 1996, Li established an agricultural company called Shunde New Century Farm in Shunde. Henderson Land, New World Development, Sino Group, and Ka Wah Group in Hong Kong invested in the company.

Lai died of Cardiovascular disease on December 25, 2022, at the age of 90. Before his death, he was reported to have contracted COVID-19 on December 15.

References

1932 births
2022 deaths
Businesspeople from Guangdong
Mayors of Guangzhou
Delegates to the 7th National People's Congress
Delegates to the 8th National People's Congress
People from Foshan
People from Shunde District
Deaths from the COVID-19 pandemic in China